English synth-pop duo Pet Shop Boys have released 14 studio albums, five live albums, seven compilation albums, four remix albums, five soundtrack albums, three extended plays and over seventy singles. The duo's debut single, "West End Girls", was first released in 1984 but failed to chart in most regions. However, the song was entirely re-recorded in late 1985, and this newly recorded version became their first number-one single, topping the UK Singles Chart, Billboard Hot 100 and Canadian Singles Chart. Parlophone released the duo's debut album, Please, in the United Kingdom in March 1986. The album peaked at number three on the UK Albums Chart and was certified platinum by the British Phonographic Industry (BPI). It also peaked at number seven on the Billboard 200 in the United States and was certified platinum by the Recording Industry Association of America (RIAA). The following summer they released "It's a Sin", the lead single from their second album, Actually. The single became another UK number one and also reached number nine in the US. This was followed by "What Have I Done to Deserve This?", with Dusty Springfield, which peaked at number two in both the UK and US. In the summer of 1987, the Pet Shop Boys recorded a cover of Brenda Lee's song "Always on My Mind", which became their third UK number-one single over Christmas 1987. This was followed by another UK number one, "Heart", in spring 1988. The album Actually was released in September 1987, peaked at number two in the UK and was certified three-times platinum by the BPI.

The duo's third album, Introspective, was released in October 1988 and peaked at number two in the UK and Germany and was certified two-times platinum by the BPI. Next album Behaviour, came in 1990 and became their third album in a row to debut and peak at number two in the UK. The duo then released their first hits compilation, Discography, which included all of their single releases as well as two new tracks. In 1993 they released a cover of the Village People single "Go West", which reached number two in the UK. The duo's fifth album, Very, followed and is the only Pet Shop Boys album, so far, to reach number one in the UK. In 1994 they recorded the Comic Relief charity single, "Absolutely Fabulous", under the pseudonym of Absolutely Fabulous. The duo do not consider it as a Pet Shop Boys single release and it was not included on any of their "best-of" albums. The duo then released a B-side collection album, Alternative in 1995. "Se a vida é (That's the Way Life Is)", was released in the summer of 1996, a Latin American music-inspired track, featuring a drum sample, which preceded the sixth Pet Shop Boys album, Bilingual.

Nightlife, the duo's seventh album came in 1999, followed by the modestly successful album Release in 2002. In November 2003, Pet Shop Boys released a second greatest hits album, PopArt: The Hits. The ninth Pet Shop Boys studio album, Fundamental, came in May 2006, reaching number five in the UK. Also in 2006, Concrete was released, a live album recorded at the Mermaid Theatre, London. Released in UK in March 2009, Yes, was a critical success and hit number four, their highest album chart peak in more than a decade. The Pet Shop Boys also received the BPI's award for "Outstanding Contribution to British Music", at the 2009 Brit Awards ceremony. In December 2009, they released an EP of covers, remixes, and new material, titled Christmas.

Ultimate, the one-disc compilation, was released on 1 November 2010 to celebrate 25 years since the band's first single release. The special version included a DVD with over three hours of BBC TV performances of 27 singles by Pet Shop Boys, released by arrangement with BBC Music. As well as the complete Glastonbury Festival performance from June 2010. Ultimate peaked at 27 on the UK charts. The second B-side compilation album, Format, was released on 6 February 2012, reaching number 26 in the UK. The duo released their eleventh studio album, Elysium, in late 2012, reaching number 9 in the UK. Elysium spawned the singles "Winner", "Leaving" and "Memory of the Future".

In March 2013, the Pet Shop Boys started a new chapter in their career when they left their long-term label, Parlophone, and signed with Kobalt Label Services. A new album, Electric, was released in July 2013, reaching number 3 in the UK and number 26 in the United States, their highest-peaking album for nearly 20 years in both countries. The singles from this album were "Axis", "Vocal", "Love is a Bourgeois Construct", "Thursday" (featuring Example) and "Fluorescent". The duo undertook a worldwide tour to support the album. In November 2014, they returned to the studio to begin working on their next album. With Stuart Price returning as producer, Super was announced on 21 January 2016 for release on 1 April. "Inner Sanctum" was released as a teaser track. The first single proper was "The Pop Kids", released on 26 February 2016.

Albums

Studio albums

Live albums

Compilation albums

Remix albums

Soundtrack albums

Extended plays

Singles

1980s

1990s

2000s

2010s and 2020s

As featured artist

Videography

Video albums

Music videos

Other appearances

Notes

References

External links
 
 
 
 

Discography
Discographies of British artists
Electronic music discographies
Pop music group discographies